Hollands Maandblad (formerly Hollands Weekblad) is a Dutch literary and political magazine founded by K. L. Poll.

History
It was founded on 20 May 1959, as a weekly called Hollands Weekblad. Its founding editor was K. L. Poll, who for decades was also its only editor (he was also editor for the Algemeen Handelsblad, later merged into NRC Handelsblad). After 1962 the weekly became a monthly and was given its current title. Besides being known as a publication venue for beginning writers (Maarten Biesheuvel published his first story in the magazine), it is also a popular forum for essayists and politicians.

It shares many prose writers with Maatstaf.

Subsidy and award
Like most Dutch literary magazines, it was initially subsidized by the government, but after 1997 this changed, when the advising agency thought the magazine was "too journalistic" and didn't generate enough discussion. The magazine continued without subsidy, but the subsidy was restored in 2004 after the magazine was judged to be trendsetting. In 2007 the magazine received an award from the Lucas-Ooms Fonds, an organization that promotes magazine journalism, as one of the most outstanding literary magazines.

Editors
After the death of K.L. Poll, in 1990, the magazine was edited by J.J. Peereboom, who collaborated with Poll from the magazine's early days. At the end of 1994 an editorial team of four was instated, consisting of Peereboom, Marie-Anne van Wijnen, Maarten Doorman, and Bastiaan Bommeljé. In January 2001, the latter became the sole editor; he resigned in January 2019 and was succeeded by David Garvelink.

Hollands Maandblad scholarships
Since 2004 the magazine awards scholarships to promising young writers of prose, poetry, and essays.

References

External links
 
 Older editions of Hollands Maandblad, online at Digital Library for Dutch Literature

Dutch-language magazines